Bangavan is a village in Salarpur block, Budaun district, Uttar Pradesh, India. Its village code is 128500. As per the report of 2011 Census of India, The total population of the village is 857, where 454 are males and 403 are females. The village is administrated by Gram Panchayat.

References

Villages in Budaun district